Kari Helliesen  (born 2 November 1938) is a Norwegian politician.

She was born in Stavanger to Marie Elisabeth Kløvstad and rector and politician Gustav Natvig-Pedersen. She was elected deputy representative to the Storting for the periods 1985–1989, 1989–1993 and 1993–1997 for the Labour Party. She replaced Gunnar Berge at the Storting from May 1986 to September 1989, when Berge was Minister of Finance, and replaced Gunn Vigdis Olsen-Hagen after her death in December 1989.

References

1938 births
Living people
Labour Party (Norway) politicians
Members of the Storting
Politicians from Stavanger